2018 in film is an overview of events, including the highest-grossing films, award ceremonies, critics' lists of the best films of 2018, festivals, a list of films released and notable deaths.

Evaluation of the year
Richard Brody of The New Yorker said, "2018 has been a banner year for movies, but you'd never know it from a trip to a local multiplex—or from a glimpse at the Oscarizables. The gap between what's good and what's widely available in theatres—between the cinema of resistance and the cinema of consensus—is wider than ever." He also stated, "In some cases, streaming has filled the gap. Several of the year's best movies, such Shirkers and The Ballad of Buster Scruggs, are being released by Netflix at the same time as (or just after) a limited theatrical run. Others, which barely qualified as having theatrical releases (one theatre for a week), are now available to stream online, on demand, and are more widely accessible to viewers (albeit at home) than films playing at thousands of multiplexes. Yet an impermanence, a threat of disappearance with the flick of a switch, hangs threateningly over independent films that are sent out on streaming."

Highest-grossing films

The top films released in 2018 by worldwide gross are as follows:

Avengers: Infinity War grossed $2 billion worldwide, becoming the fourth movie to surpass the milestone, and 4th highest-grossing film of all time. Black Panther, Jurassic World: Fallen Kingdom, Incredibles 2, and Aquaman have each grossed over $1 billion, making them among the highest-grossing films of all time, with Incredibles 2 becoming the 2nd highest-grossing animated film of all time.

2018 box office records
 The Marvel Cinematic Universe became the first film franchise to gross more than $14billion with the release of Black Panther, and the first franchise to release five billion-dollar-grossing films (with Black Panther joining The Avengers, Iron Man 3, Avengers: Age of Ultron, and Captain America: Civil War). Two months later, the MCU became the first film franchise to gross more than $15billion and $16billion with the release of Avengers: Infinity War, which became the sixth billion-dollar-grossing film in the franchise, and also the first film in the franchise to earn $2 billion; and the MCU also became the first film franchise with two billion-dollar-grossing films released in the same year (with Black Panther and Avengers: Infinity War). Two months after that, the MCU became the first film franchise to gross over $17billion with the release of Ant-Man and the Wasp.
The record breaking number was largely attributed to the Lunar New Year holiday. The highest-grossing films in China during the month were the domestic films Operation Red Sea, Monster Hunt 2, and Detective Chinatown 2, and the Indian film Secret Superstar.
 For the first time in history, February recorded $1 billion ticket sales in North America, fueled largely by the success of Disney/Marvel's Black Panther which represented 43% or $428.8 million of the entire month's ticket sales. The previous February record was in 2012 with $818.4 million.
 In China, the combined opening weekend numbers of Monster Hunt 2, Detective Chinatown 2, The Monkey King 3, Operation Red Sea and Boonie Bears: The Big Shrink amounted to a record breaking  or  weekend with online ticket sales, which is more than double the feat achieved in 2017 and 2016 during the same time period. The previous weekend record was set in North America during the weekend of December 18–20, 2017, when the combined grosses of several films resulted in  led by Star Wars: The Force Awakens  debut.
 The same weekend, China also set a new IMAX opening record when the combined IMAX earnings of the three films recorded , led by Monster Hunt 2 and Detective Chinatown 2.
 During the first quarter of 2018, China overtook North America as the world's largest box office market for the first time, with China grossing  compared to North America's  during that quarter. Despite declining revenue from Hollywood films, Chinese box office growth was driven primarily by domestic Chinese films, led by Operation Red Sea and Detective Chinatown 2, along with non-Hollywood foreign films, led by Indian Bollywood films Secret Superstar and Bajrangi Bhaijaan.

Studio records
 Walt Disney Studios became the fastest studio ever to reach $1 billion for the year at the domestic box office; it reached this goal in 117 days on April 27, 2018, beating its own record of 128 days set on May 7, 2016.
 Walt Disney Studios also grossed over $7 billion worldwide and $3 billion domestic, making it its 2nd time after 2016. It passed Disney's 2016 domestic gross and it's in 2nd place this year.
 With Incredibles 2, Pixar became the first animation studio to have three animated films (Toy Story 3, Finding Dory) each surpass $1 billion at the worldwide box office.

Film records
 Black Panther grossed $202million in its opening weekend and $242.16million over the four-day holiday weekend, breaking the record for a February opening weekend and a Presidents' Day weekend, surpassing Deadpool ($132.4million and $152.2million in 2016), and recording the biggest opening weekend and total for a film directed by a black filmmaker, surpassing The Fate of the Furious ($98.8million by F. Gary Gray in 2017). It also became just the fifth movie ever to gross more than $200million domestically in its opening weekend (joining The Avengers, Jurassic World, Star Wars: The Force Awakens, and Star Wars: The Last Jedi). On Monday, February 19, the film grossed another $40.17million, breaking the record for a Monday gross and surpassing Force Awakens ($40.11million on December 21, 2015). The subsequent $242.16 million four-day opening weekend became the second-biggest four-day gross ever, only behind The Force Awakens''' $288.07 million. On February 23–25, the film grossed another $111.7million, recording the second-biggest second weekend gross behind The Force Awakens ($149.2million on December 25–27, 2015) and becoming just the fourth film to gross more than $100million in its second weekend (joining The Avengers, Jurassic World, and The Force Awakens). On February 27, the film became the first superhero origin film and the tenth film overall to gross $500 million domestically (doing so in 17 days, the third fastest film to reach the milestone behind The Force Awakens and The Last Jedi), surpassing Wonder Woman ($412.6million in 2017) to become the highest-grossing single character superhero origin film; on March 9, the film reached $549.2million domestically, surpassing The Dark Knight to become the highest grossing solo superhero film of all time. On March 16, the film became the seventh film to gross $600 million domestically (doing so in 31 days, the second fastest film to reach the milestone behind The Force Awakens), and just the second superhero movie to do so (along with Avengers). On March 30, the film became the fifth film to gross $650 million domestically (doing so in 45 days, the second fastest film to reach the milestone behind Force Awakens). On August 3, it reached a total domestic gross of $700 million, becoming the third film to reach the mark. 
 Black Panther also became the highest-grossing film of all time in West and East Africa, and the southern Africa region.
 On March 9–12, Ryan Coogler's Black Panther retained the #1 box office spot with a $40.8million fourth weekend (the fourth biggest, behind American Sniper, Avatar, and The Force Awakens), while Ava DuVernay's A Wrinkle in Time opened at the #2 spot with a $33.1million debut, marking the first time in history that the top two spots of a weekend were both held by black directors.
 Avengers: Infinity War grossed $258million in its opening weekend, breaking the record for biggest domestic opening weekend and surpassing The Force Awakens ( in 2015). The film grossed $641million worldwide opening weekend, becoming the first film ever to open with more than  globally and surpassing The Fate of the Furious ($542 million in 2017). On April 27, the film grossed $106 million in its opening day, the second-highest single day gross behind The Force Awakens ($119 million in 2015) to become just the third movie ever to gross more than $100 million in a single day (joining The Force Awakens and The Last Jedi); on April 28, the film grossed another , breaking the record for a Saturday gross and surpassing Jurassic World ($69.6 million on 13 June 2015); on April 29, the film grossed another $69.2 million, breaking the record for a Sunday gross and surpassing The Force Awakens ($60.5 million on 20 December 2015). The film became the second film of the decade to gross $2 billion, making the 2010s the first decade to have two films gross $2 billion.
 Bohemian Rhapsody, based on the life of Queen's lead vocalist Freddie Mercury, grossed over  worldwide, setting all-time records for the highest-grossing biopic ever, the highest-grossing musical biopic, and the highest-grossing drama film (without any action or fantasy).
 Secret Superstar, an Indian musical drama film that had its China release in January 2018, grossed $29.2million in its opening weekend there, setting a record for an Indian film in China, surpassing Dangal; Bollywood superstar Aamir Khan produced and starred in both films. Secret Superstars first-week gross in China was $47million, also a record for an Indian film in the country, again surpassing Dangal. Secret Superstar was the fourth highest-grossing foreign film in China during JanuaryApril 2018.
 Incredibles 2 grossed $182.7 million domestically and $235.8 million worldwide in its opening weekend, setting records for the biggest domestic opening weekend for both Pixar and any animated film (surpassing Finding Dory, with $135.1 million in 2016), the biggest worldwide opening for Pixar (surpassing Finding Dory), and the biggest opening weekend worldwide for an animated film (surpassing Ice Age: Dawn of the Dinosaurs, with $218.4 million in 2009). It also set the record for the biggest opening for a PG rated movie (surpassing Beauty and the Beast with $174.8 million in 2017). It became the first animated film to earn $500 million at the domestic box office, later the first animated film to earn $600 million at the domestic box office, earning just over $602 million and surpassing the previous record set by Finding Dory by over $100 million. It is also the fastest animated film to gross $1 billion worldwide doing so in 46 days, surpassing Minions'' (49 days).

Events

Award ceremonies

Festivals
List of some of the film festivals for 2018 that have been accredited by the International Federation of Film Producers Associations (FIAPF).

Awards

2018 films 
The list of films released in 2018, arranged by country, are as follows:

 List of American films of 2018
 List of Australian films of 2018
 List of Bangladeshi films of 2018
 List of Brazilian films of 2018
 List of British films of 2018
 List of French films of 2018
 List of Hong Kong films of 2018
 List of Indian films of 2018
 List of Indonesian films
 List of Japanese films of 2018
 List of Pakistani films of 2018
 List of Portuguese films of 2018
 List of Russian films of 2018
 List of South Korean films of 2018
 List of Spanish films of 2018
 List of Turkish films of 2018

Deaths

Notes

References

 
Film by year
2018-related lists
Mass media timelines by year